Luiz Felipe Palmeira Lampreia (19 October 1941 – 2 February 2016) was a Brazilian diplomat and sociologist. He was born in Rio de Janeiro. Lampreia worked as a professor at Pontifical Catholic University of Rio de Janeiro. He served as chairman of the Industry Federation of the State of Rio de Janeiro. He created a blog during his later career called O Globo.

Lampreia served as ambassador to Suriname from 1983 until 1985, and ambassor to Portugal from 1990 to 1992. He served as Ministry of Foreign Affairs from 1995 to 2001.

Lampreia died in Rio de Janeiro from a heart attack on 2 February 2016 at the age of 74.

Honors and awards
  : Medal of the Oriental Republic of Uruguay (7 May 1997).

References

1941 births
2016 deaths
Foreign ministers of Brazil
Ambassadors of Brazil to Suriname
Ambassadors of Brazil to Portugal
Brazilian diplomats
Brazilian sociologists
People from Rio de Janeiro (city)
Academic staff of the Pontifical Catholic University of Rio de Janeiro
Recipients of the Medal of the Oriental Republic of Uruguay
Honorary Knights Grand Cross of the Order of St Michael and St George